Birbanki is a village in the Arki CD block in the Khunti Sadar subdivision of the Khunti district in the Indian state of Jharkhand.

Geography

Location
Birbanki is located at

Area overview
In the adjacent map the area shown is “undulating and covered with hills, hillocks and jungles (jungles/ forests are shown as shaded area in the map). The soil of the area is rocky, sandy and red loam upland. There are paddy fields only in the depressions. In 2011, it had a density of population of 210 persons per sq km. Khunti is an overwhelmingly rural district with 91.5% of the population living in rural areas. Famous places in this area are Ulihatu, the birth place of Bhagwan Birsa Munda, and Dombari Buru, the central point of his activity.

Note: The map alongside presents some of the notable locations in the district. All places marked in the map are linked in the larger full screen map.

Demographics
According to the 2011 Census of India, Birbanki had a total population of 2,681, of which 1,346 (50%) were males and 1,335 (50%) were females. Population in the age range 0–6 years was 497 The total number of literate persons in Birbanki was 828 (37.91% of the population over 6 years).

(*For language details see Arki block#Language and religion)

Education
Project High School Birbanki is a Hindi-medium coeducational institution established in 1981. It has facilities for teaching in classes IX and X. The school has a playground and a library with 226 books.

Healthcare
There is a Primary Health Centre in Birbanki.

References

Villages in Khunti district